Route 122 or Highway 122 may refer to:

Brazil
 BR-122

Canada
 New Brunswick Route 122
 Ontario Highway 122 (former)
 Prince Edward Island Route 122
 Quebec Route 122

Costa Rica
 National Route 122

India
 National Highway 122 (India)
 State Highway 122 (Rajasthan)

Japan
 Japan National Route 122

United States
 U.S. Route 122 (former)
 Alabama State Route 122
 Arkansas Highway 122
 California State Route 122 (never built)
 Connecticut Route 122
 Florida State Road 122
 County Road 122 (Baker County, Florida)
 Georgia State Route 122
 Hawaii Route 122
 Illinois Route 122
 Indiana State Road 122 (former)
 Iowa Highway 122
 K-122 (Kansas highway) (former)
 Kentucky Route 122
 Louisiana Highway 122
 Maine State Route 122
 Maryland Route 122
 Massachusetts Route 122
 Massachusetts Route 122A
 M-122 (Michigan highway) (former)
 Minnesota State Highway 122 (former)
 County Road 122 (Hennepin County, Minnesota)
 Missouri Route 122
 New Hampshire Route 122
 New Jersey Route 122
 New Mexico State Road 122
 New York State Route 122
 County Route 122 (Erie County, New York)
 County Route 122 (Fulton County, New York)
 County Route 122 (Jefferson County, New York)
 County Route 122 (Montgomery County, New York)
 County Route 122 (Niagara County, New York)
 County Route 122 (Onondaga County, New York)
 County Route 122 (Rensselaer County, New York)
 County Route 122 (Steuben County, New York)
 County Route 122 (Tompkins County, New York)
 North Carolina Highway 122
 Ohio State Route 122
 Rhode Island Route 122
 South Carolina Highway 122
 Tennessee State Route 122
 Texas State Highway 122 (former)
 Texas State Highway Spur 122
 Farm to Market Road 122
 Utah State Route 122
 Vermont Route 122
 Virginia State Route 122
 Virginia State Route 122 (1923-1925) (former)
 Virginia State Route 122 (1925-1928) (former)
 Virginia State Route 122 (1928-1933) (former)
 Washington State Route 122
 West Virginia Route 122
 Wisconsin Highway 122

Territories
 Puerto Rico Highway 122